Arion obesoductus is a species of air-breathing land slug, a terrestrial pulmonate gastropod mollusk in the family Arionidae, the round-back slugs.

Distribution
Arion obesoductus has been described from Austria. The distribution of Arion obesoductus also includes:
 southern parts of the Czech Republic
 Germany

References

Arion (gastropod)
Molluscs of Europe
Gastropods described in 1973
Taxonomy articles created by Polbot